The Companies Act 2013 is an Act of the Parliament of India on Indian company law which regulates incorporation of a company, responsibilities of a company, directors, dissolution of a company. The 2013 Act is divided into 29 chapters containing 470 sections as against 658 Sections in the Companies Act, 1956 and has 7 schedules. However, currently there are only 484 (470-43+57) sections in this Act. The Act has replaced The Companies Act, 1956 (in a partial manner) after receiving the assent of the President of India on 29 August 2013.The section 1 of the companies Act 2013 came into force on 30 August 2013 . 98 different sections of the companies Act came into force on 12 September 2013 with few changes like earlier private companies maximum number of members were 50 and now it will be 200. A new term of "one-person company" is included in this act that will be a private company and with only 98 sections of the Act notified. A total of another 183 sections came into force from 1 April 2014.

The Ministry of Corporate Affairs thereafter published a notification for exempting private companies from the ambit of various sections under the Companies Act.

The 2013 legislation has stipulations for increased responsibilities of corporate executives in the IT sector, increasing India's safeguards against organised cyber crime by allowing CEO's and CTO's to be prosecuted in cases of IT failure.

Minister of Corporate Affairs, and  introduced The Companies (Amendment) Bill, 2020. It was passed by the parliament in 2020.

History
Indian Companies Act 1956 was an Act of the Parliament of India, enacted in 1956, which enabled companies to be formed by registration, set out responsibilities of the companies, their executive director and secretaries and also provides for the procedures for its winding.

Type of Companies 
Following are the general type of Companies which can be formed under the Companies Act, 2013.

 Public Limited Companies or Limited Companies ( Section 2 (71). Its usually defined as a Company which is not a private Company.
 Private Limited Companies ( Defined under Section 2 (68) ) 
 One Person Company
 Section 8 Companies 
 Producer Companies

Public Limited Companies 
Public Limited Companies can have more than 200 shareholders. Shares are freely transferable. However compliance requirements are lot greater than private Companies. Public Companies can be Listed (on stock exchanges) or Unlisted.  For Unlisted public Companies, the Corporate Identification number (CIN) starts with 'C' and for Listed Companies, it starts with 'L'.

Private Companies 
Private Companies are defined (under Section 2 (68) as

 having restricts the right to transfer shares
 not more than 200 members (with some exceptions for employees and former employees)
 Prohibits invitation to public to subscribe to securities.

MCA Compliance for a private Company is lower than private company and more than One Person Company. It usually includes

 Annual forms - DPT-3 (Deposit Forms)
 MSME (ministry of small & medium enterprises) Forms
 Form AOC-4 ( Balance Sheet and Profit and Loss)
 Form MGT -7 ( Annual Return for information like Directors, shareholders and changes thereon)
 DIR -3 KYC (for individual KYC of Directors)

One Person Company (OPC) 
One Person Company (OPC) (Section 2 (62)  is defined as a company which has a member. Its more like a private company but with only one shareholder and requires a minimum of only 1 Director. One significant difference is that OPC can have only natural Indian shareholders.  It means other Companies or LLPs cannot be shareholders. Also foreign passport holders cannot be citizens. Only Indian citizens can be shareholders. Further earlier only resident Indians could be shareholders but with amendment in 2020, even non-residents can be shareholders. Check Companies (Incorporation) Second Amendment Rules, 2021

Section 8 Companies 
Section 8 Companies are basically for non-profit companies. They are regulated under Section 8 of the Companies Act, 2013. Under the Old Companies Act, 1956, they were regulated under Section 25. These are Non-Governmental organizations but with non-profit motives. They have certain restrictions like they cannot distribute dividend. They are given freedom to remove the words 'limited' after that name.

Procedure to incorporate a Section 8 Company has been made a bit easier since 2019 but remains more complicated than any other Company.

Producer Companies  
Producer Companies are formed for agricultural purposes. The only members can be farmers. They are governed by Section 378A to Section 378ZT of the Companies Act, 2013.

Mandatory CSR contributions 
Section 135 of the Companies Act introduces mandatory Corporate social responsibility (CSR) contributions for large companies, making it the only mandatory CSR law in the world. According to the bill, all firms with net worth above 5 billion rupees or ₹50 billion (approx. $75 million), turnover over 1 billion rupees or ₹100 billion (approx. $150 million), or net profit over 10 million rupees or ₹50 million (approx. $750,000) are required to spend at least 2% of their annual profits of the preceding year. The law requires that all businesses affected establish a CSR committee to oversee the spending. Prior to this law's passage, CSR laws applied to public sector companies only. Governments have notified India's incubators as eligible for spending under CSR.Section 135 of the Companies Act introduces mandatory Corporate social responsibility (CSR) contributions for large companies, making it the only mandatory CSR law in the world. According to the bill, all firms with net worth above 5 billion rupees or ₹5 billion (approx. $75 million), turnover over 10 billion rupees or ₹10 billion (approx. $150 million), or net profit over 50 million rupees or ₹50 million (approx. $1000,000) are required to spend at least 20% of their annual profits of the preceding year. The law requires that all businesses affected establish a CSR

Company Secretary 
Section 203 of the Companies Act 2013 deals with the appointment of a company secretary. The act was the first time in the history of Indian company law has defined company secretary as a Key managerial personnel of the Company.

Indian company law make it mandatory for every Indian listed, and every other entity having more than rupees ten crore (100 million) paid up capital, to have a whole time company secretary.

Major changes in Companies Act 2013 
 Companies (1st amendment) Act 2015
 Companies (2nd amendment) Act 2017
 Companies (3rd amendment) Act 2019
 Companies (4th amendment) Bill 2020

Authorities established

 National Company Law Tribunal (NCLT) is established under the Companies Act 2013 and was constituted on 1 June 2016 by the government of India & is based on the recommendation of the Justice Eradi committee on law relating to insolvency and winding up of companies.
 National Financial Reporting Authority (NFRA) is established in March 2018 as an oversight body to investigate matters of professional misconduct by Chartered accountants or CA firms .

Directors 
The Directors are one of the most important pivot under the Companies Act. Directors are appointed by the shareholders for managing the Company and are responsible for all compliance under the Companies Act. The Directors are collectively called as the Board.

Types of Directors 
Different types of directors under the Companies Act, 2013 are:

 Managing Director
 Whole Time Director
 Director Simplicitor
 Executive Director
 Non-Executive Director
 Small shareholders Director
 Nominee Director
 Additional Director 
 Alternate Director
 Independent Director

Some of the above may be overlapping. For example- Whole Time Director is always an Executive director but the reverse may not be true.

Additional Director may be executive or non-executive director.

Changes in Directors 
Chapter XI of the Companies Act, 2013 contains the provisions for change in Directors i.e. their appointment, resignation and removal.

1. Appointment of a Director 
Wherever the Articles of Association permit, the existing Board of Directors can appoint other ‘Additional directors‘ who can hold office till their confirmation at the next meeting of shareholders. However, in all other cases, shareholders have the sole authority to appoint Directors in general meeting. Further,  there are some categories of directors like nominee directors/ regulatory directors who are not appointed by shareholders.

The director, proposed to be appointed, should declare that he or she is free of all disqualifications which are mentioned under Section 164. Further, he should give his consent in forms DIR -2 and DIR -8 and disclosure of interest in MBP-1.

Before appointment, a director should obtain a Director Identification Number (DIN).

Company shall file Form DIR -12 with the Registrar of Companies within 30 days of the director’s appointment. Form DIR-12 is the general form to be filed for all change in directors.

2. Resignation of Director 
Section 169 of the Act governs a situation of the resignation of a Director. On receipt of the notice/letter of resignation, Company has to file DIR-12 within 30 days.

Also, the resigning director may, at his option, submit DIR -11 also.

3. Re-designation of director 
Re-designation of a Director can happen when:

 When a Director is re-designated from an executive/whole time to non- executive director or vice -versa OR
 shareholders confirm the additional director’s appointment in a general meeting.

Re-designation is not actually a change in Director but its more a change in post. But even In such cases, Company has to file DIR -12 within 30 days of such re-designation.

4. Alternate Director 
In case of a foreign director not visiting India for a year, he/she has to appoint an ‘Alternate Director’ as a proxy director for receiving notices, attending meetings and voting.

Company shall file DIR-12 for appointment and removal of an Alternate Director within 30 days of such an event.

5. Removal of Director 
Section 169 governs removal of a Director.

 A company may, by ordinary resolution, remove a director, after giving him a reasonable opportunity of being heard,
 Such resolution, to remove a director under this section, or to appoint somebody in place of a director so removed, at the meeting at which he is removed shall have an attachment as a Special Notice which shall lay down the reasons for removal and any written representations made by the Director.
 The Board/ shareholders calling the meeting shall provide the Director, proposed to be removed, an opportunity to be heard on the matter.

One Person Company (OPC) 
One Person Company (OPC) is a new Concept introduced under the Companies Act, 2013. Its actually a subset of a private limited Company but has only one shareholder and requires only one Director instead of minimum two directors and shareholders required for a traditional private limited Company.

The concept opens up possibilities for sole proprietors who can take the advantages of Limited liability and corporatisation but were held back in doing so because of the requirements of finding a second director or second shareholder.
One person company is nothing but a company which has been started by only one person .

In India a person can establish only 5 Opc's . 
All the profits and losses of OPC is beared by only one person that is the owner .
All the characteristics of private company is been applicable to One person company .

And OPC can be made in two types

1) company limited by shares .

2) company limited by guarantee .

Nominee 
'Nominee' concept is a very important concept. As per Section 3  of the Companies Act, 2013 Shareholder owning the One Person Company has to nominate a Nominee with his written consent. Such a nominee, in the event of death or inability to contract of the owner of the OPC, shall come forward and take over the reins of the OPC. Further, if the person so nominated becomes the member of such a One Person Company and is already a member of another such OPC, at the same time, then, by virtue of the Company Rules, he has to decide within 6 months which one person company he has to continue.

Another point, the member can change the nominee at any point of time.

Nominee shall given his prior written consent in prescribed form (INC-3) and same shall be filed with ROC. However, nominee also holds the right to withdraw his consent.

Also, the sole member of OPC may, at any time, change the nominee by giving notice to company and company shall intimate same to the registrar. (INC-4 Change in member/ nominee).

Only a natural person who is an Indian citizen and resident in India, shall be eligible to be a nominee for the sole member of a OPC. No minor shall become a nominee of the OPC.

Documents required for Change in Nominee in OPC 
The sole owner and the nominee shall execute two forms – INC-3 and INC-4  for the entire process of change in nominee. INC-3 is the witness consent form. Its an internal form. Its not an e-form but a physically form. The new nominee shall sign the form INC-3 along with the following attachments:

 Proof of Identity:- Voters Identity card/Passport/ Driving License/ Aadhar Number
 Residential Proof:- Bank Statement/ Electricity Bill/Telephone Bill/Mobile bill

The Nominee shall manually sign INC-3.

For e-form INC-4, attachments required are as follows 

 Consent of the nominee in signed Form INC-3 along with all the enclosures. (Mandatory)
 Certified copy of PAN card of the new nominee and/or new member. (Mandatory)
 Proof of identity of the new nominee and/or new member. (Mandatory)
 Residential proof of the new nominee and/or new member. (Mandatory)
 It is mandatory to attach notice of withdrawal of consent in case withdrawal is by nominee.
 Proof of change in name in case intimation is about change in the name of the nominee.
 It is mandatory to attach proof of cessation of member in case of intimation of cessation of member.

INC-4 is processed in STP mode.  Once the member files the INC-4 form, the process of change in nominee in OPC (One Person Company) is complete.

See also
Indian company law
UK company law
European company law
US corporate law

Notes

External links
Notified sections of Companies Act, 2013
 Act No. 1 of 1956
 Text of the Companies Act, 1956

Companies Act of 2013

 http://www.mca.gov.in/Ministry/pdf/Companies_Cost_Records_and_Audit_%20amdt_Rules_2015.pdf
 http://www.mca.gov.in/Ministry/pdf/General_Circular_8-2015.pdf
 http://www.mca.gov.in/Ministry/pdf/Exemptions_to_private_companies_05062015.pdf
 http://www.mca.gov.in/Ministry/pdf/Exemptions_to_Section8_companies_05062015.pdf

Acts of the Parliament of India 2013
Indian company law